Mark Sztyndera (born 28 February 1986) is a German international rugby union player, playing for Stade Niortais and the German national rugby union team.

Sztyndera played in the 2010 and 2011 German championship final for SC 1880 Frankfurt, both of which the club lost.

Sztyndera joined multiple German champions SC 1880 Frankfurt at the end of the 2008–09 season, leaving his previous club, the RK Heusenstamm. He originally hails from the rugby department of Eintracht Frankfurt. After the 2011–12 season he left Frankfurt to join French side Niortais to play alongside another German international, Robert Mohr.

He made his debut for Germany in a friendly against Hong Kong on 12 December 2009.

Sztyndera has also played for the Germany's 7's side in the past, like at the 2009 London Sevens.

With thirteen tries, he was his club's best try scorer in the 2009–10 season.

Honors

Club
 German rugby union championship
 Runners up: 2010
 German sevens championship
 Runners-up: 2009
 German rugby union cup
 Winners: 2010

Stats
Mark Sztyndera's personal statistics in club and international rugby:

Club

 As of 30 April 2012

National team

European Nations Cup

Friendlies & other competitions

 As of 28 April 2013

References

External links
 Mark Sztyndera at scrum.com
   Mark Sztyndera at totalrugby.de
  Mark Sztyndera at the DRV website

1986 births
Living people
German rugby union players
Germany international rugby union players
RK Heusenstamm players
SC 1880 Frankfurt players
Eintracht Frankfurt rugby players
Rugby union wings
Expatriate rugby union players in France
German expatriate rugby union players
German expatriate sportspeople in France